Chowdasandra Honnappa Bhagavathar (14 January 1915 – 2 October 1992) was an Indian theatre and film actor, producer, musician and singer. He was best known as a singer and as one of the pioneers of Kannada cinema. He was also active in Tamil cinema. His son Bharath was also an actor who worked in Kannada films and serials.

Early life
He was born in 1915 at Chowdasandra, Nelamangala to Chikkalingappa and Kallamma. He weaved for a living. At age 5 he lost his father and grew up listening to his mother's Bhajans and music. He moved to Bangalore for work, learn classical music, accidentally he met his guru Sambandha Murthy Bhagavathar (Hari katha vidwan in three south Indian languages & also classical musician) in a relative's marriage function and became his disciple for learning classical music. He first became a pupil of his relative Murthy, then a pupil of harmonium player Arunachalappa.

Honappa staged a play in Salem and at the same time M. K. Thyagaraja Bhagavathar, who was a rising star in Tamil cinema, recommended Bhagvathar to director Ellis R. Duncan for a supporting role in his film Ambikapathi. Bhagvathar play was a success and he was honoured with the title "Bhagavathar" and was from then on credited as Honnappa Bhagavathar.

Career
Bhagavathar acted in many Tamil films. Based now in Bangalore, Bhagavathar replaced M. K. Thyagaraja Bhagavathar in the 1946 movie Sri Murugan, acting alongside MGR. Both Bhagvathar and Jeevaratnam sang in the movie, with music scored by S. M. Subbaiah Naidu. Bhagvathar founded a production company named Lalithakaala Films. It produced films in Kannada and Tamil. In 1955, his film Mahakavi Kaalidasa was the first in the Kannada language. He produced Uzhavukkum Thozhilukkum Vandhanai Seivom, a Tamil-language film that was released in 1959.

He made his Kannada acting debut in the FILM Subadra. Bhagvathar is known for bringing actresses like B. Saroja Devi into the industry. In the film Valmiki, Bhagvathar replaced M. K. Thyagaraja Bhagavathar as Valmiki, the sinner-turned-sage. Bhagvathar became a star after M. K. Thyagaraja Bhagavathar's temporary exit, playing the lead role in many Tamil movies and later in Kannada. He played the bandit-turned-sage. He also played the lead role in Mahakavi Kalidasa, which is regarded as a classic in Kannada cinema. At the 3rd National Film Awards, the film won the award for Best Feature Film in Kannada.

In 1960, Bhagavathar started the music school "Nadabrahma Sangeetha Vidyalaya". He became a member of the Kannada Film Advisory Board and worked as a member of Karnataka Sangeeta Nruthya Academy.

Partial filmography

Awards
 Mahakavi Kalidasa and Jagajyothi Basveshwara received National Awards in 1955 and 1959 respectively. 
 In 1956, the Madras Sina Pyans Associations awarded him 'Best Actor'.
 In 1976, he was conferred the title "Gana Kalabhushana". 
 In 1978, Scholars of Mysore state conferred the title 'Gaanakalaa Gandharva' on him. 
 In 1986, he was awarded the 'Rajyothsava Award'.
 In 1990, he was awarded the 'Sangeet Natak Academy Award' by the President of India.
 In 1991, the Center for Music Drama Academy awarded him for his contribution to music. Also awarded for his stage music in this year.

References

External links
 
 News Article
 Fan site
 

Male actors in Kannada cinema
Male actors in Tamil cinema
Kannada film score composers
Tamil film score composers
Indian male stage actors
Film producers from Bangalore
1915 births
1992 deaths
20th-century Indian composers
Male actors from Bangalore
Musicians from Bangalore
Indian male film actors
20th-century Indian male actors